Dhairyashilrao Yeshwantrao Pawar was an Indian politician. He was a Member of Parliament  representing Maharashtra in the Rajya Sabha the upper house of India's Parliament as member  of the  Indian National Congress.

References

1922 births
2003 deaths
Rajya Sabha members from Maharashtra
Indian National Congress politicians